Toomas Järveoja (born 23 April 1961) is an Estonian politician. He is a member of XIV Riigikogu.

He was born in Elva. In 1984, he graduated from Tallinn University of Technology.

From 2011 until 2015, he was the mayor of Elva. His son is rally co-driver Martin Järveoja.

References

Living people
1961 births
Estonian Reform Party politicians
Members of the Riigikogu, 2019–2023
20th-century Estonian politicians
21st-century Estonian politicians
Tallinn University of Technology
People from Elva, Estonia